Rohan Pate, a former U-19 Maharashtra cricket player, founded Blades of Glory Cricket Museum in Pune. Sachin Tendulkar formally inaugurated Blades of glory in 2012. The museum has over 51,000 cricket items, and more than 450 International Players have visited the place.

About the gallery 
The gallery has many cricket items such as bats signed by the captains of the World Cup winning team; personal cricket items signed and used by Sir Donald Bradman, Kapil Dev, Mahendra Singh Dhoni,  Desmond Haynes, Sir Alastair Cook , Sir Viv Richards,  Ricky Pointing, Imran Khan, Sunil Gavasakar, Wasim Akram, Jaques kallis, Sourav Ganguly and Virat Kohli; bats signed by each member of World Cup winning team; world T20 team; and a pair of trousers that Sachin Tendulkar wore in test cricket in his 50th century and world cup 2011 winning used and signed shirt.

The gallery is 5000 sq.ft long with a large collection of autographs of cricketers in various themes.

References

External links 

Blades of Glory - World’s Biggest Cricket Museum, Pune, Maharashtra Collected 50,000+ Cricket Memorabilia in World Record of India

Museums in Pune